Guys Like Us is an American sitcom created by Dan Schneider for the UPN channel. It was Schneider's first creator credit. The series aired from October 5, 1998 to January 18, 1999, and it starred Bumper Robinson, Maestro Harrell, and Chris Hardwick. The show was designed with the goal of being a launching vehicle for Maestro Harrell, who would later gain fame for his role as Randy Wagstaff on the HBO show The Wire.

Synopsis
The series is centered around bachelors Sean Barker (Hardwick) and Jared Harris (Robinson), and Jared's six-year-old brother Maestro (Maestro Harrell), who comes to live with them after Jared's father accepts a freelance position overseas. Now the two bachelors must give up some of their perks to develop their crude parenting skills.

The show's premise, in which a younger sibling moves in with their older sibling after a parent gets a job overseas, would later be applied to the premise of two other sitcoms created by Dan Schneider, the WB sitcom What I Like About You and the Nickelodeon series iCarly.

Timeslot
The first 4 episodes aired on Mondays at 8 p.m. and then starting with the fifth episode the remaining episodes aired at 8:30 p.m. on Mondays, however the series finale never aired.

Cancellation
Due to low ratings, UPN cancelled the show after its first season.

Cast

Main
 Chris Hardwick as Sean Barker
 Bumper Robinson as Jared Harris
 Maestro Harrell as Maestro Harris
 Karen Maruyama as Kim

Recurring
 Linda Cardellini as Jude

Episodes

Awards and nominations

References

External links
 
 

1990s American black sitcoms
1990s American sitcoms
1998 American television series debuts
1999 American television series endings
English-language television shows
UPN original programming
Television shows set in Los Angeles
Television series by Sony Pictures Television
Television series created by Dan Schneider